is a Japanese television drama released on June 3, 2005.  Unlike many other dramas, it was never aired on television but released as a set of 3 DVDs. Volumes one and two contain the first 4 episodes while volume three contains the last episode. Each episode is approximately 70 minutes.

The Tokyo Friends Premium Box was also released which includes all 5 episodes, a bonus DVD, and 12 postcards.  Although this is a very typical Tokyo-story and was never aired, it was quite successful probably because it was Ai Otsuka's debut as an actress.

Plot
Rei Iwatsuki moved from her hometown Kōchi to Tokyo to pursue her dreams.  On arrival, she found a job as a waitress in a restaurant and met guitarist Ryuuji Shintani. Ryuuji liked her voice and invited her to join his band as the vocalist, The Survival Company (also known as Sabakan).  The two started a relationship but then broke off when Rei wanted to write her own songs.

Rei met other girls also working in the restaurant, Hirono, Ryoko and Maki, all in pursuit of their own dreams, and became good friends with all of them.

Cast
 Ai Otsuka - Rei Iwatsuki
 Eita - Ryuuji Shintani
 Rio Matsumoto - Hirono Hayama
 Masanobu Katsumura - Kazuo Sasakawa
 Yōko Maki - Ryoko Fujiki
 Mao Kobayashi - Maki Abiko
 Ryuta Sato - Kenichi Satomi
 Yuuta Hiraoka - Hidetoshi Tanaka
 Kuranosuke Sasaki - Kohashi
 Mari Hoshino - Akemi
 Kei Tanaka - Wataru Iwatsuki
 Kazuki Kitamura -  Keitaro Sasakawa
 Hajime Okayama
 Kazuyuki Asano
 Yutaka Matsushige -  Shirakawa
 Shunta Nakamura -  Mitsuo Nagase
 Takashi Ito - Oku-chan
 Yuu Misaki -  Yoshie Sasakawa
 Arata Furuta -  Wada

Tokyo Friends: The Movie
Tokyo Friends: The Movie was released on DVD on December 13, 2006.

Tokyo friends OST
 Friends :  Music : Yoshiki composer : Yoshiki Lyrics : Yoshiki
 Haneirai Tamago : Music : Yoshiki : composer : Yoshiki Lyrics : Ai Otsuka
 To me : Music : Yoshiki : composer : Yoshiki Lyrics : Ai Otsuka
 Friends (Sabakan Ver): Music : Ai Otsuka composer : Yoshiki Lyrics : Yoshiki

External links
  
 

Japanese drama television series
2000s Japanese television series